The Golden Globe Award for Best Original Song is a Golden Globe Award that was awarded for the first time in 1962 and has been awarded annually since 1965 by the Hollywood Foreign Press Association. The award is presented to the songwriters of a song written specifically for a motion picture. The performers of the song are not credited, unless they also have a writing or co-writing credit.

Winners and nominees

1960s
1961: "Town Without Pity" by Gene Pitney (Dimitri Tiomkin & Ned Washington) – Town Without Pity

1964: "Circus World" (Dimitri Tiomkin & Ned Washington) – Circus World 
 "Dear Heart" (Henry Mancini, Jay Livingston & Ray Evans) – Dear Heart
 "From Russia with Love" (John Barry & Lionel Bart) – From Russia with Love
 "Sunday in New York" (Peter Nero & Carroll Coates) – Sunday in New York
 "Where Love Has Gone" (Jimmy Van Heusen & Sammy Cahn) – Where Love Has Gone

1965: "Forget Domani" (Riz Ortolani & Norman Newell) – The Yellow Rolls-Royce 
 "Ballad of Cat Ballou" (Jerry Livingston & Mack David) – Cat Ballou
 "The Sweetheart Tree" (Henry Mancini & Johnny Mercer) – The Great Race
 "The Shadow of Your Smile" by Vic Damone (Johnny Mandel & Paul Francis Webster) – The Sandpiper
 "That Funny Feeling" by Bobby Darin (Walden Cassotto) – That Funny Feeling

1966: "Strangers in the Night" by Frank Sinatra (Bert Kaempfert, Charles Singleton & Eddie Snyder) – A Man Could Get Killed 
 "Alfie" by Dionne Warwick (Burt Bacharach & Hal David) – Alfie
 "Born Free" by Matt Monro (John Barry & Don Black) – Born Free
 "Georgy Girl" by The Seekers (Tom Springfield & Jim Dale) – Georgy Girl
 "A Man and a Woman" (Francis Lai & Pierre Barouh) – A Man and a Woman (Un homme et une femme)

1967: "If Ever I Would Leave You" by Richard Harris (Frederick Loewe & Alan Jay Lerner) – Camelot 
 "Talk to the Animals" by Rex Harrison (Leslie Bricusse) – Doctor Dolittle
 "Circles in the Water (Des ronds dans l'eau)" (Francis Lai & Norman Gimbel) – Live for Life (Vivre pour vivre)
 "Please Don't Gamble with Love" (Guy Hemric & Jerry Styner – Ski Fever
 "Thoroughly Modern Millie" (Jimmy Van Heusen & Sammy Cahn) – Thoroughly Modern Millie

1968: "The Windmills of Your Mind" by Noel Harrison – (Michel Legrand, Alan and Marilyn Bergman) – The Thomas Crown Affair 
 "Buona Sera, Mrs. Campbell" (Riz Ortolani & Melvin Frank) – Buona Sera, Mrs. Campbell
 "Chitty Chitty Bang Bang" (Richard M. Sherman & Robert B. Sherman) – Chitty Chitty Bang Bang
 "Funny Girl" by Barbra Streisand (Jule Styne & Bob Merrill) – Funny Girl
 "Star" (Jimmy Van Heusen & Sammy Cahn) – Star!

1969: "Jean" by Rod McKuen – The Prime of Miss Jean Brodie
 "Raindrops Keep Falling on My Head" by B.J. Thomas (Burt Bacharach & Hal David) – Butch Cassidy and the Sundance Kid
 "The Time for Love Is Anytime" (Quincy Jones & Cynthia Weil) – Cactus Flower
 "Goodbye, Columbus" by Jim Yester – Goodbye, Columbus
 "What Are You Doing the Rest of Your Life?" (Michel Legrand, Alan and Marilyn Bergman) – The Happy Ending
 "Stay" (Ernest Gold & Norman Gimbel) – The Secret of Santa Vittoria
 "True Grit" by Glen Campbell – True Grit Lyrics by Don Black, Music by Elmer Bernstein

1970s
1970: "Whistling Away the Dark" (Henry Mancini & Johnny Mercer) – Darling Lili  
 "Ballad of Little Fauss and Big Halsey" – Little Fauss and Big Halsy
 "Till Love Touches Your Life" – Madron 
 "Pieces of Dreams" – Pieces of Dreams 
 "Thank You Very Much" (Leslie Bricusse) – Scrooge 

1971: "Life Is What You Make It" (Marvin Hamlisch & Johnny Mercer) – Kotch  
 "Rain Falls Anywhere It Wants To" – The African Elephant
 "Something More" – Honky
 "Theme from Shaft" by Isaac Hayes – Shaft
 "Long Ago Tomorrow" – The Raging Moon

1972: "Ben" by Michael Jackson (Walter Scharf & Don Black) – Ben  
 "Carry Me" – Butterflies Are Free
 "Mein Herr" by Liza Minnelli (John Kander & Fred Ebb) – Cabaret
 "Money, Money" by Joel Grey and Liza Minnelli (Kander & Ebb) – Cabaret
 "Dueling Banjos" – Deliverance
 "Marmalade, Molasses and Honey" – The Life and Times of Judge Roy Bean 
 "Take Me Home" – Molly and Lawless John
 "The Morning After" by Maureen McGovern – The Poseidon Adventure

1973: "The Way We Were" by Barbra Streisand (Marvin Hamlisch, Alan and Marilyn Bergman) – The Way We Were  
 "Breezy's Song" – Breezy
 "Lonely Looking Sky" by Neil Diamond – Jonathan Livingston Seagull
 "Rosa Rosa" – Kazablan
 "Send a Little Love My Way" – Oklahoma Crude
 "All That Love Went to Waste" – A Touch of Class 

1974: "I Feel Love" (Euel Box & Betty Box) – Benji  
 "On and On" by Gladys Knight & the Pips (Curtis Mayfield) – Claudine
 "Sail the Summer Winds" – The Dove
 "I Never Met a Rose" (Frederick Loewe & Alan Jay Lerner) – The Little Prince
 "We May Never Love Like This Again" by Maureen McGovern – The Towering Inferno 

1975: "I'm Easy" by Keith Carradine (Carradine) – Nashville  
 "How Lucky Can You Get" – Funny Lady 
 "My Little Friend" – Paper Tiger
 "Now That We're in Love" – Whiffs 
 "Richard's Window" – The Other Side of the Mountain 

1976: "Evergreen" by Barbra Streisand (Streisand & Paul Williams) – A Star Is Born  
 "Bugsy Malone" (Williams) – Bugsy Malone
 "Car Wash" by Rose Royce – Car Wash
 "I'd Like to Be You for a Day" – Freaky Friday
 "Hello and Goodbye" – From Noon Till Three
 "So Sad the Song" – Pipe Dreams

1977: "You Light Up My Life" Music & Lyrics by Joseph Brooks, performed by Kasey Cisyk – You Light Up My Life  
 "Down Deep Inside (Theme From The Deep)" by Donna Summer – The Deep
 "New York, New York" by Liza Minnelli – New York, New York
 "How Deep Is Your Love" by The Bee Gees – Saturday Night Fever
 "Nobody Does It Better" by Carly Simon (Marvin Hamlisch & Carole Bayer Sager) – The Spy Who Loved Me 

1978: "Last Dance" by Donna Summer (Paul Jabara) – Thank God It's Friday 
 "Ready to Take a Chance Again" by Barry Manilow (Charles Fox & Norman Gimbel) – Foul Play 
 "Grease" by Frankie Valli (Barry Gibb) – Grease
 "You're the One That I Want" by Olivia Newton-John and John Travolta (John Farrar) – Grease
 "The Last Time I Felt Like This" (Marvin Hamlisch, Alan and Marilyn Bergman) – Same Time, Next Year 

1979: "The Rose" by Bette Midler (Amanda McBroom) – The Rose
 "Through the Eyes of Love" (Marvin Hamlisch & Carole Bayer Sager) – Ice Castles
 "The Main Event" by Barbra Streisand – The Main Event
 "Rainbow Connection" by Kermit the Frog (Paul Williams & Kenny Ascher) – The Muppet Movie 
 "Better Than Ever" – Starting Over

1980s
1980: "Fame" by Irene Cara (Michael Gore & Dean Pitchford) – Fame 
 "Call Me" by Blondie (Giorgio Moroder & Angela Trimble) – American Gigolo
 "Yesterday's Dreams" – Falling in Love Again
 "Love on the Rocks" by Neil Diamond – The Jazz Singer
 "9 to 5" by Dolly Parton – 9 to 5

1981: "Arthur's Theme (Best That You Can Do)" by Christopher Cross (Peter Woolnough, Burt Bacharach, Christopher Geppert & Carole Bayer Sager) – Arthur  
 "It's Wrong for Me to Love You" by Pia Zadora – Butterfly 
 "Endless Love" by Lionel Richie and Diana Ross (Richie) – Endless Love 
 "For Your Eyes Only" by Sheena Easton – For Your Eyes Only 
 "One More Hour" (Randy Newman) – Ragtime 

1982: "Up Where We Belong" by Joe Cocker and Jennifer Warnes (Jack Nitzsche, Buffy Sainte-Marie & Will Jennings) – An Officer and a Gentleman  
 "Cat People (Putting Out Fire)" by David Bowie (Giorgio Moroder & Bowie) – Cat People
 "Making Love" – Making Love
 "Eye of the Tiger" by Survivor – Rocky III 
 "If We Were in Love" (John Williams, Alan and Marilyn Bergman) – Yes, Giorgio 

1983: "Flashdance... What a Feeling" by Irene Cara *Giorgio Moroder, Cara & Keith Forsey) – Flashdance 
 "Maniac" by Michael Sembello – Flashdance
 "Far from Over" by Frank Stallone – Staying Alive
 "Over You" – Tender Mercies
 "The Way He Makes Me Feel" by Barbra Streisand – Yentl

1984: "I Just Called to Say I Love You" by Stevie Wonder (Stevland Morris) – The Woman in Red  
 "Against All Odds (Take a Look at Me Now)" by Phil Collins (Collins) – Against All Odds 
 "Footloose" by Kenny Loggins – Footloose 
 "Ghostbusters" by Ray Parker Jr. (Parker) – Ghostbusters 
 "No More Lonely Nights" by Paul McCartney (McCartney) – Give My Regards to Broad Street
 "When Doves Cry" by Prince (Prince) – Purple Rain

1985: "Say You, Say Me" by Lionel Richie (Richie) – White Nights  
 "The Power of Love" by Huey Lewis and the News – Back to the Future 
 "Rhythm of the Night" by DeBarge – The Last Dragon
 "We Don't Need Another Hero" by Tina Turner (Terry Britten & Graham Lyle) – Mad Max Beyond Thunderdome
 "A View to a Kill" by Duran Duran – A View to a Kill

1986: "Take My Breath Away" by Berlin (Giorgio Moroder & Tom Whitlock) – Top Gun 
 "Somewhere Out There" by James Ingram & Linda Ronstadt (James Horner, Barry Mann & Cynthia Weil) – An American Tail 
 "Glory of Love" by Peter Cetera – The Karate Kid Part II 
 "Sweet Freedom" by Michael McDonald (Rod Temperton) – Running Scared
 "Life in a Looking Glass" by Tony Bennett – That's Life!
 "They Don't Make Them Like They Used To" by Kenny Rogers (Burt Bacharach & Carole Bayer Sager) – Tough Guys

1987: "(I've Had) The Time of My Life" Lyrics by Franke Previte, Music by John DeNicola & Donald Markowitz, performed by Bill Medley and Jennifer Warnes – Dirty Dancing  
 "Shakedown" by Bob Seger – Beverly Hills Cop II 
 "Nothing's Gonna Stop Us Now" by Starship (Diane Warren & Albert Hammond) – Mannequin 
 "The Secret of My Success" by Night Ranger (David Foster, Michael Landau, Jack Blades & Tom Keane) – The Secret of My Succe$s
 "Who's That Girl" by Madonna (Madonna & Patrick Leonard) – Who's That Girl

1988 (TIE): "Let the River Run" by Carly Simon – Working Girl  / "Two Hearts" by Phil Collins (Lamont Dozier & Collins) – Buster 
 "When a Woman Loves a Man" by Gordon Jenkins – Bull Durham
 "Kokomo" by The Beach Boys – Cocktail
 "Why Should I Worry?" by Billy Joel – Oliver & Company
 "Twins" by Little Richard & Philip Bailey – Twins

1989: "Under the Sea" by Samuel E. Wright (Alan Menken & Howard Ashman) – The Little Mermaid 
 "After All" by Cher and Peter Cetera (Tom Snow & Dean Pitchford) – Chances Are
 "Kiss the Girl" by Samuel E. Wright (Menken & Ashman) – The Little Mermaid
 "I Love to See You Smile" by Randy Newman (Newman) – Parenthood
 "The Girl Who Used to Be Me" by Patti Austin (Marvin Hamlisch, Alan Bergman & Marilyn Bergman) – Shirley Valentine

1990s
1990: "Blaze of Glory" by Jon Bon Jovi – Young Guns II  
 "Sooner or Later" by Madonna (Stephen Sondheim) – Dick Tracy 
 "What Can You Lose?" by Madonna and Mandy Patinkin (Sondheim) – Dick Tracy
 "Promise Me You'll Remember" by Harry Connick, Jr. (Carmine Coppola & John Bettis) – The Godfather Part III 
 "I'm Checkin' Out" by Meryl Streep and Blue Rodeo – Postcards from the Edge 

1991: "Beauty and the Beast" by Peabo Bryson and Céline Dion (Alan Menken & Howard Ashman) – Beauty and the Beast  
 "Dreams to Dream" by Linda Ronstadt (James Horner & Will Jennings) - An American Tail: Fievel Goes West
 "Be Our Guest" by Angela Lansbury and Jerry Orbach (Menken & Ashman) – Beauty and the Beast 
 "(Everything I Do) I Do It for You" by Bryan Adams (Michael Kamen, Adams & Robert John "Mutt" Lange) – Robin Hood: Prince of Thieves 
 "Tears in Heaven" by Eric Clapton (Clapton & Jennings) – Rush

1992: "A Whole New World" by Peabo Bryson and Regina Belle (Alan Menken & Tim Rice) – Aladdin  
 "Friend Like Me" by Robin Williams (Menken & Rice) – Aladdin 
 "Prince Ali" by Robin Williams (Menken & Rice) – Aladdin
 "This Used to Be My Playground" by Madonna (Madonna & Shep Pettibone) – A League of Their Own
 "Beautiful Maria of My Soul" performed by Antonio Banderas - The Mambo Kings 

1993: "Streets of Philadelphia" by Bruce Springsteen (Springsteen) – Philadelphia  
 "The Day I Fall in Love" by Dolly Parton and James Ingram - Beethoven's 2nd 
 "Stay (Faraway, So Close!)" by U2 – Faraway, So Close (In weiter Ferne, so nah!)
 "You Made Me the Thief of Your Heart" by Sinead O'Connor – In the Name of the Father
 "Again" by Janet Jackson (Jackson, Jimmy Jam and Terry Lewis) – Poetic Justice 

1994: "Can You Feel the Love Tonight" by Elton John (John & Tim Rice) – The Lion King  
 "The Color of the Night" by Lauren Christy (Christy, Jud J. Friedman & Dominic Frontiere) – Color of Night 
 "Look What Love Has Done" by Patty Smyth – Junior 
 "Circle of Life" by Carmen Twillie and Lebo M. (John & Rice) –The Lion King 
 "Far Longer than Forever" by Regina Belle and Jeffrey Osborne (David Zippel & Lex de Azevedo) – The Swan Princess
 "I'll Remember" by Madonna – With Honors

1995: "Colors of the Wind" by Vanessa Williams (Alan Menken & Stephen Schwartz) – Pocahontas  
 "Hold Me, Thrill Me, Kiss Me, Kill Me" by U2 – Batman Forever
 "Have You Ever Really Loved a Woman?" by Bryan Adams (Michael Kamen, Adams & Robert John "Mutt" Lange) – Don Juan DeMarco
 "Moonlight" by Sting (John Williams, Alan and Marilyn Bergman) – Sabrina
 "You've Got a Friend in Me" by Randy Newman – Toy Story

1996: "You Must Love Me" by Madonna (Andrew Lloyd Webber & Tim Rice) – Evita 
 "I Finally Found Someone" by Barbra Streisand and Bryan Adams (Marvin Hamlisch, Streisand, Adams & Robert John "Mutt" Lange) – The Mirror Has Two Faces
 "For the First Time" by Kenny Loggins (James Newton Howard, Jud J. Friedman & Allan Rich) – One Fine Day
 "That Thing You Do" by The Wonders (Adam Schlesinger) – That Thing You Do! 
 "Because You Loved Me" by Céline Dion (Diane Warren) – Up Close and Personal

1997: "My Heart Will Go On" by Céline Dion (James Horner & Will Jennings) – Titanic 
 "Journey to the Past" by Aaliyah (Stephen Flaherty & Lynn Ahrens) – Anastasia
 "Once Upon a December" by Deana Carter (Flaherty & Ahrens) – Anastasia
 "Go the Distance" by Roger Bart (David Zippel & Matthew Wilder) – Hercules
 "Tomorrow Never Dies" by Sheryl Crow (Crow & Mitchell Froom) – Tomorrow Never Dies

1998: "The Prayer" by Céline Dion and Andrea Bocelli (David Foster, Tony Renis, Carole Bayer Sager & Alberto Testa) – Quest for Camelot 
 "Uninvited" by Alanis Morissette – City of Angels
 "The Mighty" by Sting – The Mighty
 "Reflection" by Christina Aguilera (David Zippel & Matthew Wilder) – Mulan
 "When You Believe" by Mariah Carey and Whitney Houston (Stephen Schwartz & Kenneth Edmonds) – The Prince of Egypt 
 "The Flame Still Burns" by Chris Difford, Marti Frederiksen and Mick Jones – Still Crazy

1999: "You'll Be in My Heart" by Phil Collins – Tarzan  
 "Beautiful Stranger" by Madonna (Madonna & William Wainwright) – Austin Powers: The Spy Who Shagged Me
 "How Can I Not Love You" by Joy Enriquez – Anna and the King
 "Save Me" by Aimee Mann – Magnolia 
 "When She Loved Me" by Sarah McLachlan (Randy Newman) – Toy Story 2

2000s
2000: "Things Have Changed" by Bob Dylan – Wonder Boys 
 "I've Seen It All" by Björk (Björk, Lars von Trier & Sjón) – Dancer in the Dark
 "My Funny Friend and Me" by Sting – The Emperor's New Groove
 "When You Come Back to Me Again" by Garth Brooks (Brooks & Jenny Yates) – Frequency
 "One in a Million" by Bosson – Miss Congeniality

2001: "Until..." by Sting (Sting) – Kate & Leopold  
 "Come What May" by Nicole Kidman and Ewan McGregor (David Baerwald and Kevin Gilbert) – Moulin Rouge!
 "There You'll Be" by Faith Hill (Diane Warren) – Pearl Harbor 
 "May It Be" by Enya – The Lord of the Rings: The Fellowship of the Ring  
 "Vanilla Sky" by Paul McCartney – Vanilla Sky 

2002: "The Hands That Built America" by U2 (Bono, Adam Clayton, The Edge & Larry Mullen) – Gangs of New York  
 "Lose Yourself" by Eminem – 8 Mile 
 "Die Another Day" by Madonna – Die Another Day
 "Here I Am" by Bryan Adams – Spirit: Stallion of the Cimarron
 "Father and Daughter" by Paul Simon – The Wild Thornberrys Movie 

2003: "Into the West" by Annie Lennox (Howard Shore, Fran Walsh & Lennox) – The Lord of the Rings: The Return of the King  
 "Man of the Hour" by Pearl Jam – Big Fish
 "You Will Be My Ain True Love" by Alison Krauss and Sting – Cold Mountain 
 "Time Enough for Tears" by Andrea Corr – In America
 "The Heart of Every Girl" by Elton John – Mona Lisa Smile

2004: "Old Habits Die Hard" by Mick Jagger (Jagger & David A. Stewart) – Alfie 
 "Million Voices" by Wyclef Jean – Hotel Rwanda
 "Learn to Be Lonely" by Minnie Driver (Andrew Lloyd Webber & Charles Hart) – The Phantom of the Opera 
 "Believe" by Josh Groban (Alan Silvestri & Glen Ballard) – The Polar Express 
 "Accidentally in Love" by Counting Crows (Counting Crows) – Shrek 2 

2005: "A Love That Will Never Grow Old" by Emmylou Harris (Gustavo Santaolalla & Bernie Taupin) – Brokeback Mountain 
 "Christmas in Love" by Renee Olstead – Christmas in Love
 "Wunderkind" performed by Alanis Morissette (Morissette) – The Chronicles of Narnia: The Lion, the Witch and the Wardrobe
 "There's Nothing Like a Show on Broadway" by Matthew Broderick and Nathan Lane (Mel Brooks) – The Producers
 "Travelin' Thru" by Dolly Parton (Parton) – Transamerica 

2006: "Song of the Heart" by Prince (Prince) – Happy Feet 
 "Never Gonna Break My Faith" by Aretha Franklin and Mary J. Blige – Bobby
 "Listen" by Beyoncé – Dreamgirls 
 "Try Not to Remember" by Sheryl Crow – Home of the Brave
 "A Father's Way" by Seal – The Pursuit of Happyness

2007: "Guaranteed" Music & Lyrics by Eddie Vedder, performed by Eddie Vedder – Into the Wild 
 "That's How You Know" by Amy Adams – Enchanted 
 "Grace Is Gone" by Jamie Cullum – Grace Is Gone
 "Despedida" by Shakira – Love in the Time of Cholera
 "Walk Hard" by John C. Reilly – Walk Hard: The Dewey Cox Story

2008: "The Wrestler" Music & Lyrics by Bruce Springsteen, performed by Bruce Springsteen – The Wrestler 
 "I Thought I Lost You" by Miley Cyrus and John Travolta (Cyrus & Jeffrey Steele) – Bolt
 "Once in a Lifetime" by Beyoncé (Henry Krieger, Scott Cutler, Anne Preven & Beyoncé Knowles) – Cadillac Records
 "Gran Torino" by Jamie Cullum (Cullum) – Gran Torino
 "Down to Earth" by Peter Gabriel (Thomas Newman & Gabriel) – WALL-E 

2009: "The Weary Kind" by Ryan Bingham (Bingham & Justin Burnett) – Crazy Heart  
 "I See You" by Leona Lewis – Avatar
 "Winter" by U2 (U2) – Brothers
 "(I Want To) Come Home" by Paul McCartney (McCartney) – Everybody's Fine
 "Cinema Italiano" by Kate Hudson (Maury Yeston) – Nine

2010s
2010: "You Haven't Seen the Last of Me" by Cher (Diane Warren) – Burlesque 
 "Bound to You" by Christina Aguilera (Aguilera, Sia Furler & Samuel Dixon) – Burlesque
 "There's a Place for Us" by Carrie Underwood – The Chronicles of Narnia: The Voyage of the Dawn Treader
 "Coming Home" by Gwyneth Paltrow – Country Strong
 "I See the Light" by Mandy Moore and Zachary Levi (Alan Menken and Glenn Slater) – Tangled

2011: "Masterpiece" by Madonna (Madonna, Julie Frost & Jimmy Harry) – W.E. 
 "Lay Your Head Down" by Sinéad O'Connor – Albert Nobbs
 "Hello, Hello" by Elton John & Lady Gaga (John & Bernie Taupin) – Gnomeo and Juliet
 "The Living Proof" by Mary J. Blige (Blige, Harvey Mason, Jr., Thomas Newman & Damon Thomas) – The Help
 "The Keeper" by Chris Cornell (Cornell) – Machine Gun Preacher

2012: "Skyfall" by Adele (Adele Adkins & Paul Epworth) – Skyfall 
 "For You" by Keith Urban (Urban & Monty Powell) – Act of Valor
 "Safe & Sound" by Taylor Swift and The Civil Wars – The Hunger Games
 "Suddenly" by Hugh Jackman (Claude-Michel Schönberg, Alain Boublil & Herbert Kretzmer) – Les Misérables
 "Not Running Anymore" by Jon Bon Jovi (John Bongiovi Jr.) – Stand Up Guys

2013: "Ordinary Love" by U2 (Paul Hewson, U2 & Brian Burton) – Mandela: Long Walk to Freedom 
 "Let It Go" by Idina Menzel (Kristen Anderson-Lopez & Robert Lopez) – Frozen
 "Atlas" by Coldplay (Guy Berryman Jonny Buckland, Will Champion & Chris Martin) – The Hunger Games: Catching Fire
 "Please Mr. Kennedy" (Ed Rush, George Cromarty, Justin Burnett, Justin Timberlake, Joel & Ethan Coen) – Inside Llewyn Davis
 "Sweeter than Fiction" by Taylor Swift (Swift & Jack Antonoff) – One Chance

2014: "Glory" by Common featuring John Legend (Lonnie Lynn & John Stephens) – Selma 
 "Opportunity" by Quvenzhané Wallis (Greg Kurstin, Sia Furler & Will Gluck) – Annie
 "Big Eyes" by Lana Del Rey (Elizabeth Grant & Dan Heath) – Big Eyes
 "Yellow Flicker Beat" by Lorde (Elia Yelich-O'Connor & Joel Little) – The Hunger Games: Mockingjay – Part 1
 "Mercy Is" by Patti Smith (Smith & Lenny Kaye) – Noah

2015: "Writing's on the Wall" by Sam Smith (Smith & Jimmy Napes) – Spectre 
 "Love Me like You Do" by Ellie Goulding (Max Martin, Savan Kotecha, Ali Payami, Ebba Nilsson, Ilya Salmanzadeh) – Fifty Shades of Grey
 "See You Again" by Wiz Khalifa featuring Charlie Puth (Justin Franks, Andrew Cedar, Puth & Cameron Thomaz) – Furious 7
 "One Kind of Love" by Brian Wilson (Wilson & Scott Bennett) – Love & Mercy
 "Simple Song #3" by Sumi Jo (David Lang) – Youth

2016: "City of Stars" (Justin Hurwitz, Benj Pasek & Justin Paul) – La La Land
 "Gold" by Iggy Pop (Daniel Pemberton, Brian Burton, Stephen Gaghan, James Osterberg Jr.) – Gold
 "How Far I'll Go" by Auliʻi Cravalho (Lin-Manuel Miranda) – Moana
 "Faith" by Stevie Wonder featuring Ariana Grande (Ryan Tedder, Steveland Morris & Francis Farewell Starlite) – Sing
 "Can't Stop the Feeling!" by Justin Timberlake (Max Martin, Shellback & Timberlake) – Trolls

2017: "This Is Me" by Keala Settle (Benj Pasek & Justin Paul) – The Greatest Showman
 "Remember Me" (Kristen Anderson-Lopez & Robert Lopez) – Coco
 "Home" by Nick Jonas (Jonas, Nick Monson & Justin Tranter) – Ferdinand
 "Mighty River" by Mary J. Blige (Charles Wiggins, Blige & Taura Stinson) – Mudbound
 "The Star" by Mariah Carey (Marc Shaiman & Carey) – The Star

2018: "Shallow" by Lady Gaga & Bradley Cooper (Stefani Germanotta, Mark Ronson, Anthony Rossomando & Andrew Wyatt) – A Star Is Born
 "All the Stars" by Kendrick Lamar & SZA (Anthony Tiffith, Kendrick Duckworth, Alexander Shuckburgh, Mark Spears & Solána Rowe) – Black Panther
 "Revelation" by Troye Sivan & Jónsi – (Troye Mellet & Jón Birgisson & Brett McLaughlin) – Boy Erased
 "Girl in the Movies" by Dolly Parton (Parton & Linda Perry) – Dumplin'
 "Requiem for a Private War" by Annie Lennox (Lennox) – A Private War

2019: "(I'm Gonna) Love Me Again" by Elton John and Taron Egerton (John & Bernie Taupin) – Rocketman
 "Beautiful Ghosts" by Taylor Swift (Andrew Lloyd Webber & Swift) – Cats
 "Into the Unknown" by Idina Menzel & AURORA (Kristen Anderson-Lopez & Robert Lopez) – Frozen II
 "Stand Up" by Cynthia Erivo (Joshuah Brian Campbell & Erivo) – Harriet
 "Spirit" by Beyoncé (Beyoncé, Ilya Salmanzadeh & Timothy McKenzie) – The Lion King

2020s
2020: "Io sì (Seen)" by Laura Pausini (Niccolò Agliardi, Pausini & Diane Warren) The Life Ahead
 "Fight for You" by H.E.R. (Dernst Emile II, Gabriella Wilson & Tiara Thomas) – Judas and the Black Messiah
 "Speak Now" by Leslie Odom Jr. – Music & Lyrics by: Sam Ashworth & Odom Jr. – One Night in Miami...
 "Hear My Voice" by Celeste (Daniel Pemberton & Celeste Waite) – The Trial of the Chicago 7
 "Tigress & Tweed" by Andra Day (Charles Wiggins & Cassandra Batie) – The United States vs. Billie Holiday

2021: "No Time to Die" by Billie Eilish (Eilish & Finneas O'Connell) – No Time to Die
 "Down to Joy" by Van Morrison (George Morrison) – Belfast
 "Dos Oruguitas" (Lin-Manuel Miranda) – Encanto
 "Be Alive" by Beyoncé (Beyoncé & Darius Scott) – King Richard
 "Here I Am (Singing My Way Home)" by Jennifer Hudson (Jamie Hartman, Hudson & Carole Klein) – Respect

2022: "Naatu Naatu" (M. M. Keeravani & Chandrabose) - RRR
 "Lift Me Up" by Rihanna (Ludwig Göransson, Robyn Fenty, Ryan Coogler & Temilade Openiyi) - Black Panther: Wakanda Forever
 "Ciao Papa" by Gregory Mann (Alexandre Desplat, Roeban Katz & Guillermo del Toro) - Guillermo del Toro's Pinocchio
 "Hold My Hand" by Lady Gaga (Stefani Germanotta & Michael Tucker) - Top Gun: Maverick
 "Carolina" by Taylor Swift (Swift) - Where the Crawdads Sing

See also
Academy Award for Best Original Song

References

Song Original
 
Awards established in 1961
Film awards for Best Song
Songwriting awards